Tarique Rahman is a Bangladeshi politician who is the current acting chairman of Bangladesh Nationalist Party (BNP) since February 2018. He has been residing in London, UK with his family since he left Bangladesh in September 2008. In 2018, he was sentenced to life imprisonment for organising the 2004 Dhaka grenade attack.

Early life and family
Rahman was born on 20 November 1967 in Karachi, Pakistan. He belongs to a notable Bengali Muslim political family of Mandals hailing from Bagbari in Gabtali, Bogra District. His paternal family also have Iranian ancestry via his great-grandmother Meherunnisa, whose forefathers arrived in Ghoraghat during the Mughal period. His father, Ziaur Rahman, was the 7th President of Bangladesh, and his mother, Begum Khaleda Zia, was the 10th Prime Minister and first female Prime Minister of Bangladesh.

Education 
He studied at BAF Shaheen College Dhaka and completed his SSC from Dhaka Residential Model College. He then earned his HSC from Adamjee Cantonment College

Political career
Rahman started his political career as a primary member of the BNP Gabtali Upazila, Bogura District in 1988.

Rahman actively assembled support for the party during the national elections of 1991, when the transition was taking place from the autocratic ruling to the democratic government.

Joining politics 
Rahman was a member of the BNP's National Campaign Strategy Committee, and was also responsible for coordinating the election campaigns in five constituencies from which his mother Khaleda Zia was contesting.

Major contribution in politics 
During that period, he proactively organized the BNP units of Bogura and changed the inherent cultures to make politics more production and development oriented.

After the BNP's success in the national elections of 1991 and the formation of the new government, Rahman was offered a senior role in the party as recognition of his contributions. However, he was reluctant to take up a higher position in order to have enough time to strengthen the party at the grassroots level. For many years, he remained active in developing the Bogura units of the BNP. During the national elections of 1996, the party grassroots and the senior leadership requested Rahman to contest a constituency from Bogura. But he declined the offer with a view to furthering his work at the grassroots levels and coordinating the election campaigns for his mother.

During the ruling of the Awami League government in 1996–2001, Rahman mobilized movements against the actions of the government. He actively campaigned to address issues of economic deprivation and started championing a countrywide consultation program aimed at publicizing the plight of the people living in rural areas.

This large-scale program, the first in the history of Bangladesh of this nature, drove mass mobilization against the government, which in turn, played an instrumental role in fostering the return of the BNP to power. He established the secret ballot system in Bogura to elect leaders through open council.

In the national elections held in 2001, the party won a landslide victory with a two-thirds majority.

Forced exile 
Tarique Rahman, is the prime convict to be the mastermind of 21 August 2004 terrorist grenade attack on a public rally organized by the then-opposition party Awami League. The attack using military grade Arges grenade targeted the entire top leadership of Awami League including current prime minister Sheikh Hasina and killed 24 Awami league leaders and workers including Ivy Rahman, President of Women Awami League and wife of late President Zillur Rahman. The attack also injured hundreds of victims and many became permanently crippled. He has been sentenced to life imprisonment by Bangladesh Court.

Exile and asylum
Following the release of Rahman's mother Khaleda Zia on 11 September 2008, he flew to London, United Kingdom for medical treatment at Wellington hospital, an independent private hospital in St. John's Wood. The 1/11 interim government backed by the army confirmed that Rahman gave written bond of not to indulge in any future politics and was allowed to go abroad.

The Anti corruption Commission filed 12 cases against Rahman and his friend and business partner, Giasuddin Al Mamun, which BNP claims is politically motivated and cases are being filed as part of the conspiracy of the immediate past caretaker government to prevent Rahman from participating in Bangladesh politics. On 16 October 2009 the High Court issued a rule asking the government and the Anti Corruption Commission Bangladesh to explain why the Zia Orphanage Trust corruption case against Khaleda Zia and Rahman should not be quashed on a petition filed by Zia. On 9 November 2017, the Bangladesh Supreme Court dismissed Khaleda and Rahman's petition seeking stay on trial proceedings on the Zia Orphanage Trust corruption case. The lower court now has no legal bar to continue the corruption case against them.

Khaleda Zia said her son would take part in active politics upon his return from abroad after completing treatment. She addressed a few public meetings on her way to Bogura and alleged that the present government is trying to harass her son so that he cannot return to the country. She said, "Tareque worked for the development of the country, but a lot of cases were filed only to destroy him as a part of national as well as international conspiracies" She also added, "On March 7, 2007, he was picked up in a car right in front of me. But after the custody my son had to be sent abroad in a stretcher for treatment... Doctors have said his recovery will take more time..."

On 8 December 2009 in The 5th National Council of Bangladesh Nationalist Party, Rahman was declared as the senior vice chairman of BNP.

On 25 July 2013, Rahman was invited to an iftar party in London arranged by the expatriate supporters of the party. In September 2013, some representatives from the Government of United States met Rahman and discussed some bilateral issues.

On 4 January 2014, in a video message posted on YouTube, Rahman called for a boycott of the next day's general election in Bangladesh.

In November 2018, Rahman conducted the interview process through Skype for the nomination seekers of BNP party at the 2018 Bangladeshi general election.

Cases and convictions

Money laundering case
On 7 June 2007, a money laundering case was submitted against Rahman and his friend and business partner Giasuddin Al Mamun by the Bangladesh Anti Corruption Commission at a court in Dhaka. In a verdict given on 18 November 2013 by the court, Rahman was acquitted in the case involving BDT 20.41 crore. The Bangladesh Anti Corruption Commission member Mohammad Shahabuddin rejected the verdict, saying: "Tarique and Mamun had equal footing in the crime. So, legally there was no scope to differentiate."

BNP officials and leaders claimed that this judgement is a proof of his innocence and he had no involvement with corruption, and that all the cases against Rahman were "politically motivated".

On 21 July 2016, Rahman was found guilty by the Bangladesh High Court overturning a lower court verdict that acquitted him earlier. He was sentenced to seven years of imprisonment and fined Tk 20 crore by the Court. One interesting thing to note in this case here is right after delivering the controversial not-guilty verdict, the lower court judge fled the country. Rahman's money laundering case was the first case in the country's history where an FBI agent testified and produced evidence against a defendant in Bangladeshi court. However, FBI has never confirmed this claim by the news paper Daily Star of Bangladesh.

On 3 November 2008, a leaked US Embassy cable said that the embassy in Dhaka believed Rahman was "''guilty of egregious political corruption that has had a serious adverse effect on US national interests'".

2004 Dhaka grenade attack case

On 10 October 2018, Rahman was sentenced to life in prison for the case of 2004 Dhaka grenade attack. He was accused to be the mastermind of the attack by Awami League General Secretary Obaidul Quader. However, the accusation was denied by BNP Secretary General Mirza Fakhrul Islam Alamgir.

Personal life
Rahman currently lives in suburban London. He married Zubaida Rahman, a physician and the youngest daughter of Rear Admiral Mahbub Ali Khan, former Chief of Naval Staff of Bangladesh Navy, in 1993 and the first cousin of Irene Khan, a former Secretary General of Amnesty International. Their only daughter Zaima Rahman is a barrister. Zubaida became a government physician in 1995 after passing the Bangladesh Civil Service Exam and fired by the Awami League government in September 2014 for being absent from work for six years.

References

1965 births
Living people
Dhaka Residential Model College alumni
Bangladesh Nationalist Party politicians
Children of national leaders
Ziaur Rahman
Bangladeshi politicians convicted of crimes
Bangladeshi people of Middle Eastern descent
People from Bogra District
Majumder–Zia family